"Santa Claus Goes Straight to the Ghetto" is a song recorded by American rapper Snoop Doggy Dogg featuring Daz Dillinger, Nate Dogg, Tray Deee, and Bad Azz. It was released as the only single from the album, Christmas on Death Row.

The song is titled after James Brown's version of "Santa Claus Go Straight to the Ghetto" from the 1968 album, A Soulful Christmas.

Charts

References

External links
Genius: Santa Claus Goes Straight to the Ghetto - Lyrics

1996 singles
1996 songs
Snoop Dogg songs
Daz Dillinger songs
Tray Deee songs
Nate Dogg songs
Death Row Records singles
Songs written by Snoop Dogg
Music videos directed by Paul Hunter (director)
American Christmas songs